Aylwin B. Lewis (born May 28, 1954) is an American businessman. He served as the Chairman, Chief Executive Officer and President of Potbelly Sandwich Works, June 2008 - August 2017.

Career

In 1995, Aylwin Lewis became Senior VP of Marketing and Operations Development, a job he left in 1996 for a position as Senior VP of Operations at Pizza Hut. In 1997, he was promoted to COO at Pizza Hut; in 2000, he became COO at Yum! Brands. In 2004, he became CEO of Kmart, which shortly thereafter merged with Sears. At this time, he became CEO of Sears Holdings. At Potbelly, where he was hired as CEO in 2008, Lewis led the drive to take Potbelly public. Lewis stepped down and left Potbelly in August 2017.

Sources
Periodicals

•	Chain Store Age, December 2004, p. 39.

•	Detroit News, October 19, 2004.

•	Houston Chronicle, October 19, 2004, p. 11.

•	International Herald Tribune, November 19, 2004, p. 19.

•	Knight Ridder/Tribune Business News, October 19, 2004; November 21, 2004.

•	Seattle Times, November 18, 2004, p. E1.

External links 
Aylwin Lewis Corporate Bio

1954 births
Living people
American chief executives of food industry companies
Directors of The Walt Disney Company
Houston Christian University alumni
University of Houston alumni
Place of birth missing (living people)
American chief operating officers